Teodor Pîrjol (born 22 February 1957) is a Romanian boxer. He competed in the men's heavyweight event at the 1980 Summer Olympics. At the 1980 Summer Olympics, he lost to Francesco Damiani of Italy.

References

1957 births
Living people
Romanian male boxers
Olympic boxers of Romania
Boxers at the 1980 Summer Olympics
Place of birth missing (living people)
Heavyweight boxers